is a Japanese voice actor from Tokyo, Japan. He is affiliated with Yu-rin Pro. In 2017, he won the Best New Actor Award at the 11th Seiyu Awards.

He was born in Tokyo, and is 1.64 m tall.

Filmography

Television animation
2013
A Certain Scientific Railgun S, Shun'ichi Kosako (eps 18–24)
Golden Time, High School Student (ep 7); Male Student A (ep 2); Student (ep 6), Beautician
Little Busters! Refrain, Student C (ep 8)
Strike the Blood, Takashimizu (ep 9)
White Album 2, Action Committee Member (eps 1, 7); Male Student A (ep 6)

2014
Argevollen, Tsubasa Yamanami
Magimoji Rurumo, Tomoha Sakurai
M3 the dark metal, Schoolboy B
Nanana's Buried Treasure, Haijiki Sanada
Selector Infected Wixoss, Kazuki Kurebayashi
Selector Spread Wixoss, Kazuki Kurebayashi
Shirobako, Daisuke Hiraoka, Young Masato Marukawa
Witch Craft Works, Honoka Takamiya
Yona of the Dawn, Soo-Won
Your Lie in April, Opponent

2015
Comet Lucifer, Sogo Amagi
Food Wars: Shokugeki no Soma, Zenji Marui
The Heroic Legend of Arslan, Arslan
Shimoneta, Tanukichi Okuma

2016
All Out!!, Sekito Kirishima
Bubuki Buranki, Azuma Kazuki
Prince of Stride: Alternative, Kaoru Shishibara
Re:Zero − Starting Life in Another World, Subaru Natsuki
Show by Rock!!♯, Titan
The Heroic Legend of Arslan: Dust Storm Dance, Arslan
This Art Club Has a Problem!, Subaru Uchimaki

2017 
A Sister's All You Need, Itsuki Hashima
Dive!!, Sachiya Yoshida
Dynamic Chord, Yakumo Igarashi
Fate/Apocrypha, Caules Forvedge Yggdmillennia
Fuuka, Yuu Haruna
Hand Shakers, Tomoki
Interviews with Monster Girls, Yusuke Satake
Sengoku Night Blood, Ranmaru Mori
Scum's Wish, Takuya Terauchi
The Saga of Tanya the Evil, Warren Grantz

2018
Boruto: Naruto Next Generations, Ryougi
Gundam Build Divers, Riku Mikami
Hakata Tonkotsu Ramens, Kazuki Saitoh
Sirius the Jaeger, Philip
The Seven Deadly Sins: Revival of the Commandments, Gloxinia
Captain Tsubasa, Makoto Soda
Yuuna and the Haunted Hot Springs, Yasuhisa-san

2019
Dr. Stone, Senku Ishigami
Fire Force, Arthur Boyle
High School Prodigies Have It Easy Even In Another World, Tsukasa Mikogami
Isekai Quartet, Subaru Natsuki, Warren Grantz
Kochoki: Wakaki Nobunaga, Oda Nobunaga
Mob Psycho 100 II, Toshiki Minegishi
Stars Align, Nao Tsukinose
The Case Files of Lord El-Melloi II: Rail Zeppelin Grace Note, Caules Forvedge
Why the Hell are You Here, Teacher!?, Kō Tanaka
Wise Man's Grandchild, Shin Wolford

2020
Darwin's Game, Kaname Sudō
Interspecies Reviewers, Zel
Keep Your Hands Off Eizouken!, Robot Club Kobayashi
Mewkledreamy, Asahi Minamikawa
Muhyo & Roji's Bureau of Supernatural Investigation Season 2, Daranimaru Goryō
Our Last Crusade or the Rise of a New World, Iska
Re:Zero − Starting Life in Another World 2nd Season, Subaru Natsuki
Sorcerous Stabber Orphen, Majic Lin
Yu-Gi-Oh! Sevens, Kaizō

2021
Dr. Stone: Stone Wars, Senku Ishigami
Higehiro, Hashimoto
How a Realist Hero Rebuilt the Kingdom, Kazuya Souma
Mushoku Tensei, Rowin Migurdia
Show by Rock!! Stars!!, Titan
Sorcerous Stabber Orphen: Battle of Kimluck, Majic Lin
Taisho Otome Fairy Tale, Tamahiko Shima
That Time I Got Reincarnated as a Slime Season 2, Dino
The Saint's Magic Power Is Omnipotent, Yuri Drewes

2022
Love After World Domination, Fudō Aikawa
VazzRock the Animation, Ōka

2023
Hell's Paradise: Jigokuraku, Yamada Asaemon Tenza
Ningen Fushin: Adventurers Who Don't Believe in Humanity Will Save the World, Nick
Sorcerous Stabber Orphen: Chaos in Urbanrama, Majic Lin
Synduality, Tokio
The Saint's Magic Power Is Omnipotent 2nd Season, Yuri Drewes

Original net animation (ONA)
Monster Strike (2015), Ren Homura
A.I.C.O. -Incarnation- (2018), Yuya Kanzaki
Pacific Rim: The Black (2021), Taylor Travis
Hetalia: World Stars (2021), Slovakia

Original video animation (OVA)
Nozo×Kimi (2014), Kimio Suga
Yarichin Bitch Club (2018), Takashi Tōno
Re:Zero − Starting Life in Another World: Memory Snow (2018), Subaru Natsuki

Anime films
Sword Art Online Progressive: Scherzo of Deep Night (2022), Morte

Video games
Warriors All-Stars (2017), Opoona
SHOW BY ROCK!! as Chitan
I-chu as Kuro Yakaku
Wind Boys! as Iizuka Minato
Touken Ranbu, Shinano Toushirou
Akane-sasu Sekai de Kimi to Utau, Takenaka Hanbei
Final Fantasy: Brave Exvius, Lasswell
Granblue Fantasy, Kou, The Hanged Man
Shin Megami Tensei: Liberation Dx2, Taro Fuse
Fire Emblem: Three Houses, Byleth (male)
Super Smash Bros. Ultimate, Byleth (male)
Fire Emblem Engage, Byleth (male)
BlackStar - Theatre Starless, Ginsei
Saint Seiya Awakening/ Rising Cosmo, Black Swan
ALTDEUS: Beyond Chronos (2020), Yamato Amanagi
Captain Tsubasa Dream Team, Takeshi Kishida
Honkai Impact 3 (2021), Kalpas
Witch on the Holy Night (2022), Sōjūrō Shizuki
Arknights, Lumen
Cookie Run: Kingdom, Werewolf Cookie
Onmyoji, Jinkougyou

Drama CDs
Yarichin Bitch-bu (2016), Takashi Tono
Kijima-kun no Kiken na Gakuen-sai Animate Gentei Drama CD (2016), Kishima Kōtarō
Immoral Triangle" Case1. Gokatei Triangle (2016), Mashiro Shinozaki
Bokura no Koi to Seishun no Subete CASE:02 Doukyuusei no Bokura (2016), Makoto Irei
Kikoeru? (2016), Itsuki Sakurabashi
Gourmet no Fukurami (2017), Ishimori Musashi
Deichuu no Hasu (2017), Akio Tachibana
3-pun Instant no Chinmoku (2017), Aki
Koubutsu wa Ichiban Saigo ni Hara no Naka (2017), Kazui Sabitada
Yarichin Bitch-bu 2 (2017), Takashi Tono
Zantei Boyfriend (2017), Minato Akizuki
Kakkou no Yume (2018), Hiro Shiratori
Kuruinaku no wa Boku no Ban: Beta Vol.1 (2018), Sumito Sasabe
Mo Dao Zu Shi/Ma Dou So Shi (2020), Lan Sizhui/Ran Shitsui
Otomege Sekai wa Mobu ni Kibishii Sekai desu (2020), Leon Fou Bartfort

Dubbing

Live-action
 The Edge of Seventeen (Erwin Kim (Hayden Szeto))
 The Night Shift (Devin Lawson (Jake Elliott))
 Summer of 84 (Davey Armstrong (Graham Verchere))
 Vampire Cleanup Department (Tim Cheung (Baby John Choi))

Multimedia Project

 Paradox live / Cozmez   ( Kanata Yatonokami )

Animation
Maya the Bee (Flip)
Pacific Rim: The Black (Taylor Travis)

References

External links
 Official agency profile 
 

1985 births
Crunchyroll Anime Awards winners
Living people
Japanese male video game actors
Japanese male voice actors
Male voice actors from Tokyo
Seiyu Award winners